Maria Jacoby (15 February 1900 – 22 January 1990) was a Luxembourgian painter. Her work was part of the painting event in the art competition at the 1936 Summer Olympics.

References

1900 births
1990 deaths
20th-century Luxembourgian painters
Luxembourgian women painters
Olympic competitors in art competitions
People from Main-Taunus-Kreis